John J. Astley (born 13 January 1989) is an English professional snooker player from Gateshead, Tyne and Wear.

Career

Early career
Astley first came into prominence in 2007 by winning the national Under-19 title (defeating Michael Georgiou in the final), however wins in the amateur PIOS tournaments proved hard to come by. His attempts to qualify for the main tour via Q School in 2011 and 2012 were unsuccessful as well. Nevertheless, Astley gained enough sponsorship to be able to enter all the PTC events in the 2012–13 season as an amateur. He reached the last 32 stage three times and finished fourth highest ranked amateur on the Order of Merit, winning a tour card for 2013–14 and 2014–15 seasons.

2013/2014
Astley won his opening match of the season 5–2 against Mike Dunn to reach the main draw of the Wuxi Classic. In his first appearance in a ranking event Astley was whitewashed 5–0 by Robert Milkins. He won a match in a ranking event for the first time by edging out Ken Doherty 6–5 in the UK Championship, a performance he described afterwards as the best of his career. He lost 6–1 against Stuart Carrington in the next round. Astley also qualified for the China Open with a 5–2 success over Robbie Williams and then came through a wildcard round match once in China, before losing 5–1 to Ding Junhui. Astley beat Sam Baird 10–9 in the first round of World Championship qualifying, but his season ended in his next match with a heavy 10–2 loss to Jamie Cope. He finished his debut season on the tour ranked world number 98. Astley was awarded the Rookie of the Year Award at the World Snooker Annual Award Ceremony.

2014/2015
Astley's 2014–15 season proved to be disappointing as he could not qualify for any ranking event, other than the UK Championship and Welsh Open for which he gained automatic entry. He lost in the first round of the UK 6–2 to Jamie Cope and beat David Gilbert 4–1 at the Welsh, before Gary Wilson knocked him out 4–3 in the second round. Astley played in all six of the minor-ranking European Tour events but could not win a match in any of them. After losing his first qualifying match for the World Championship to Dominic Dale, Astley was relegated from the tour as he was ranked 86th in the world.

2015/2016
Astley only entered Q School in the 2015–16 season and in the Second Event he beat Peter Lines 4–0 to secure a two-year tour card.

2016/2017
At the 2016 Riga Masters, Astley beat Joe Perry 4–1, Andy Hicks 4–2 and Jimmy Robertson 4–1 to play in the quarter-finals of a ranking event for the first time in his career, where he lost 4–1 to Mark Williams. He also reached the third round of the Indian Open and Paul Hunter Classic and was defeated 4–2 by Nigel Bond and 4–1 by Zack Richardson. Astley qualified for the International Championship by overcoming Peter Ebdon 6–3 and then saw off Mark King 6–4 once in China, before losing 6–2 to Mark Selby. He recovered to win 5–4 from 4–0 down against Kyren Wilson to qualify for the German Masters, where he was edged out 5–4 by Ricky Walden in the opening round. Astley progressed through to the fourth round of the Gibraltar Open by 4–1 victories over Andreas Ploner, George Pragnall and Ben Woollaston and was eliminated 4–2 by Ryan Day. He finished his first year back on the tour ranked world number 76.

Outside snooker
In March 2016, Astley appeared on-stage at the Sheffield Crucible in Richard Bean's play, The Nap, as the opponent of lead Jack O'Connell's character.

Performance and rankings timeline

Tournament wins

Amateur
 English Under-19 Championship, 2007
 EBSA Qualifying Tour – Bulgaria, 2012

References

External links

John Astley at worldsnooker.com

1989 births
Living people
English snooker players
Sportspeople from Gateshead
21st-century English people